Stumble is a 2003 Indian film.

Stumble, Stumbles, or The Stumble may also refer to:

 Stumbles, a surname
 Stumble (album), an album by the AALY Trio + Ken Vandermark
 "Stumble", a 2005 song by Calla from the album Collisions
 "The Stumble", a blues guitar instrumental
 The Stumble (film), a 1953 Iranian film

See also
 
 
 Serendipity, the effect by which one accidentally stumbles upon something fortunate
 Trip (disambiguation)